Pub is the only album by the British band Denzil, released in 1994.

Critical reception
Billboard praised the "clever" lyrics and "charmingly rough-edged" singing. The Washington Post declared that "every one of the 16 songs on Pub boasts an ear-catching melody driven by an energetic, economical rhythm section." Ira Robbins of Trouser Press found Denzil to be "a welcome entrant in the English furrow between early Elvis Costello and late Richard Thompson", praising the "memorable tunes ... tastefully backed by an electric trio".

In a retrospective review for AllMusic, Andy Hinds gave the album a positive review and stated, "Based around Denzil's everyman voice and workmanlike acoustic guitar, the well-recorded tunes are usually augmented by drums, bass, jangly electric guitar, and other well-chosen instruments. This excellent album and artist were nearly completely overlooked." 

In 1999, The Tulsa World included Pub on their list of the "100 Greatest Albums You Never Heard Of".

Track listing
All songs written by Denzil Thomas.

"Fat Loose Fancies Me"
"Running This Family"
"Rake Around the Grave"
"Useless"
"Sunday Service Hengistbury Head"
"Too Scared to Be True"
"Bastard Son of Elvis"
"Funnymoon"
"Shame"
"Who Made You So Cynical About Me?"
"Autistic"
"If Only Alan Won the Pools"
"Seven Years in These Boots"
"Your Sister Song"
"Cutie"
"Goodnight Darling"

Personnel
Denzil – vocals, acoustic guitar
Steve Ennever – bass, harmonica
Craig Boyd – guitar
Andrew Place – drums

Additional musicians
Tich – fiddle
Jo Garret – additional vocals
Jeremy Stacey – drums

Technical
Steve Ennever – producer
Michael Leshay – executive producer
Tony Cousins – mastering
Stuart Flynn – photography
Denzil – art direction, co-designer
Michael Diehl – co-designer

References

External links
YouTube: www.youtube.com/user/denzilpub

1994 debut albums
Giant Records (Warner) albums